Idalia may refer to:

 Idalia (genus), genus of moths

Places
 Idalia, Queensland, suburb of Townsville, Queensland, Australia
 Idalia, Colorado, unincorporated community in Yuma County, Colorado, US
 Idalia, Missouri, unincorporated community in Stoddard County, Missouri, US
 Idalia Manor, historic home located at Mt. Pleasant, New Castle County, Delaware, US
 Idalia, a name of the ancient city of Idalium in Cyprus

People
 Sobriquet of Greek goddess Aphrodite
 Idalia Anreus (1932–1998), Cuban actress who worked in both theatre and film
 Idalia Gumbs (1933–2000), Anguillan politician
 Idalia Hechavarría (born 1974), Cuban sprinter